Scot Carrier is a UK-registered cargo ship, built in Hoogezand in the Netherlands. She entered service for her owners Scotline in December 2018.

History 

On 13 December 2021 at 03:30, Scot Carrier was involved in a ship accident between Kåseberga in southern Skåne, and the Danish island of Bornholm. Scot Carrier collided with the Danish hopper barge , with two people on board, which capsized. One crewmember of the capsized ship died, and the other was declared missing.

The rescue operation was extensive with about 10 boats from the Sea Rescue and the Coast Guard, also planes and helicopters participated in the search for the crew. While diving, one person was found dead on board a cabin, one person is still missing.

Two people on the Scot Carrier were arrested immediately, one was released after questioning, the other was arrested on suspicion of causing another person's death, aggravated drunken driving and aggravated negligence in maritime traffic. 

The British crew member, who had been in custody in Trelleborg since 15 December 2021, had his appeal in both the Court of Appeal and the Supreme Court rejected, and was in February 2022 handed over to Denmark for the upcoming trial. The trial in Copenhagen District Court started on the 16th of  June 2022. The British crew member was convicted of all charges at the city court of Copenhagen, and is set to serve 1,5 years in prison. Furthermore, they will be denied entry to Denmark for the next 12 years, and they have lost their right to pilot ships in Danish waters.

References

External links 
 The shipping company Scotlines  website.
 The shipping company Høj A/S website.
The accident on BBC.
 The Maritime Executive.

2018 ships
Ships built in the Netherlands
Cargo ships of the United Kingdom
Maritime incidents in 2021